Zarrinabad-e Sofla (also Romanized as Zarrīnābād-e Soflá; also known as Pā’īn Zarrīnābād and Zarrīnābād-e Pā’īn) is a village in Miandorud-e Kuchak Rural District, in the Central District of Sari County, Mazandaran Province, Iran. At the 2006 census, its population was 631, in 168 families.

References 

Populated places in Sari County